Cristian Ambrozie "Coro" Coroian (born 14 March 1973) is a Romanian retired footballer and manager. He used to play as a forward and almost all his career he played for CFR Cluj and Gloria Bistrița, entering in the hall of fame of these clubs.

Career 
Coroian began football at CFR Cluj in 1993. He later went on to play for many years at Gloria Bistrița before moving back to his first team. Coroian returned to Gloria Bistrița, being an emblematic player for this club. Coroian played 7 games and scored two goals in CFR Cluj's 2005 Intertoto Cup campaign in which the club reached the final. He was a flexible player, with the ability to play in any midfield or forward position. In 2009, he became assistant coach of Gloria Bistrița.

In April 2013, he began his first experience as head-coach, at Liga II team FCM Târgu Mureș. He was sacked at the end of the season, being changed with Edward Iordănescu.

In July 2013 Coroian became the technical director of Gloria Bistrița, with his former colleague in the offensive line, Sandu Negrean, as head coach.

In 2014 Coroian was hired as Metalurgistul Cugir manager and after a promising first season things have taken an unexpected turn. On 22 July 2015, during a training, he suffered a stroke after which he remained sequelae and was forced to withdraw from his football manager career.

On 8 July 2017, in an event organized by CFR Cluj, a charity match was played on Dr. Constantin Rădulescu Stadium between CFR Cluj and Gloria Bistriţa old boys teams. In the composition of the teams were former colleagues of "Coro" such as: Adrian Anca, Dorinel Munteanu, Cristian Panin or Cosmin Tilincă (CFR Cluj); Ovidiu Maier, Sandu Negrean or Valer Săsărman (Gloria Bistriţa).

International 
In 2006, he was proposed for the Romania national football team, but never played for them.

Honours
CFR Cluj
Divizia C: 1995–96
UEFA Intertoto Cup runner-up: 2005

References

External links
 
 

1973 births
Living people
People from Gherla
Romanian footballers
Association football forwards
Liga I players
Liga II players
CFR Cluj players
FC Universitatea Cluj players
FC Progresul București players
ACF Gloria Bistrița players
Romanian football managers
ASA 2013 Târgu Mureș managers